Charles Evans Jr. (born 1962) is an American film producer and documentary film director.  He produced Johnny Depp's first directorial effort, The Brave. He was one of four producers on the 2004 Howard Hughes biopic The Aviator, although his production credit was controversial. Evans is the nephew of former motion picture studio executive Robert Evans, and the son of fashion industry executive and motion picture producer Charles Evans.

Life and career
Evans was born in Manhattan, New York, 1963 to Charles Evans Sr. and his first wife, Frances (a documentary filmmaker). His uncle is studio executive and actor Robert Evans. Charles had two sisters: Melissa (born in 1965) and Elizabeth (born in 1966). His parents divorced in 1967. Charles attended the Allen-Stevenson School, a private elementary school for boys.

In 1975, Charles and his family were caught in a deadly fire in their triplex apartment on East 80th Street in New York City. His mother and two sisters were asphyxiated by toxic fumes during the fire. The fire was caused by ashes falling out of their fireplace. Charles Jr., sleeping in another room, was rescued by firefighters and uninjured.

In the aftermath of the deadly fire, 12-year-old Charles Jr. "put on an overcoat and went to live with my father," in his words. He also began taking illegal narcotics. He developed a serious addiction. Charles Jr. attended the Williston Northampton School, University of California, Berkeley and then the USC School of Cinematic Arts. His father was ambivalent about the decision. "I certainly didn't give him any encouragement. I think it's a stinking business. But he's wanted to do it since he was in grade school. He wanted to either write, direct or produce."

His first professional credit came on the 1988 horror film on Monkey Shines, which was financially backed by his father. He served as an assistant director on the picture. His first producer's credit came with the 1990 film The Brave, which was also Johnny Depp's directorial debut. Evans formed his own production company, Acappella Pictures, in 1993. In 1998, Evans said he had purchased a script by Frederic Raphael which adapted the 1905 Edith Wharton novel, The House of Mirth, for the big screen. But financing and cast did not fall into placed in time, and producer Olivia Stewart's competing project made it into production first. (It was released in 2000.)

Evans was also the producer and director of the 2012 documentary film Addiction Incorporated. The documentary reports on the ways in which research scientists, corporate whistleblowers, the news media, and attorneys for smokers exposed the tobacco industry's attempts to conceal the ways in which cigarettes were made more addictive.

The Aviator controversy
Evans also served a producer of the 2004 Howard Hughes biopic, The Aviator. His involvement with the film proved controversial. According to Evans, he began researching the life of Hughes in 1993. In 1996, Evans optioned the book Howard Hughes: The Untold Story, by Pat H. Broeske and Peter Harry Brown. Evans hired several writers, who produced five or six drafts of a script, but the screenplay was still not in an acceptable form. These included several drafts of a script by Broeske and Brown, and at least one version by Dean Ollins. Evans then met with actor Kevin Spacey, who was interested in directing the film. Spacey helped Evans find financing, and New Regency Productions agreed to put up the money. Screenwriter Jack Fincher was brought aboard to do another script draft.

Evans convinced Leonardo DiCaprio to play the lead in 1998. But DiCaprio insisted that he be allowed to pick the director. Evans removed Spacey as the director, DiCaprio joined the production, and in December 1998 DiCaprio chose Michael Mann as the director. Mann subsequently hired Tony- and Oscar-nominated screenwriter John Logan in the spring of 1999 to write yet another screenplay. Logan's contract with the producers guaranteed him sole screenplay credit. The producers and director were also barred from hiring writers to revise Logan's script, or from claiming any role in the script (even if they made a contribution). Evans began sharing with Mann and Logan his large archive of Hughes memorabilia and biographical materials (which Evans says he had been building since 1995).

In March 2000, Evans says, he learned that Mann had taken the project to New Line Cinema.  Evans sued for breach of implied contract, fraud, and intentional interference with economic advantage. Mann strongly denied the accusations, arguing that his Howard Hughes biopic had nothing to do with the one he and Evans had worked on. A confidential out-of-court settlement was reached in 2001, and Evans was granted producer credit on Mann's New Line Cinema picture.

Mann later decided to step aside as director in favor Martin Scorsese. Mann's business partner, Sandy Climan, was added to the film as a producer. Also added as producer was Graham King, whose Initial Entertainment Group helped finance the picture.

Controversy continued to dog the film during awards season.  In 1998, five producers accepted Oscars for the film Shakespeare in Love. Worried that producer credits were getting out of hand, the Academy of Motion Picture Arts and Sciences changes its rules to permit no more than three producers to receive an Oscar for a Best Picture film. The Howard Hughes biopic—now titled The Aviator—had four producers. The Aviator was nominated for best motion picture at the 2004 Producers Guild of America Awards. However, the Producers Guild of America ruled that neither Evans nor Climan deserved a producer's credit. The Aviator won the award for best motion picture, with King and Mann accepting the honor. During the after-show picture-taking, King and Mann invited Climan and Scorsese to stand on the stage with them, but Evans was not. Evans pushed his way past security, and stood with the other producers. The photograph shows Climan, King, Mann, and Scorsese facing one way, while Evans stands slightly apart and facing another direction. Evans subsequently demanded that he be included as one of the three producers nominated to receive the Oscar should The Aviator win the Academy Award for Best Picture. Shortly before the Oscar ceremony, the Academy of Motion Picture Arts and Sciences decided that, although Evans and Climan were both producers of The Aviator, neither individual qualified under Academy rules to be on stage to receive the Oscar. As matters stood, The Aviator lost the Best Picture nod to Million Dollar Baby.

Charitable work
Charles Evans Jr. is the chair of the board of trustees of the Charles Evans Foundation, a nonprofit charitable foundation established by his father. The Charles Evans Foundation provides grant awards to a wide range of projects in the fields of AIDS/HIV education and research, Alzheimer's disease research, the arts, assistance for the developmentally disabled, assistance for the homeless, cancer research, education, environmentalism, fire safety, health care, investigative journalism, literacy, and medical research, among others.

References

External links

C-SPAN Q&A interview with Evans and Victor DeNoble about Addiction Incorporated, February 19, 2012

1963 births
Living people
Film producers from New York (state)
Filmmakers who won the Best Film BAFTA Award
People from the Upper East Side
USC School of Cinematic Arts alumni
Evans family (Paramount Pictures)
20th-century American Jews
21st-century American Jews